Ancula evelinae is a species of sea slug, a dorid nudibranch, a marine gastropod mollusc in the family Goniodorididae.

Distribution
This species was first described from Beaufort, North Carolina.

Description
This goniodorid nudibranch is translucent white in colour with black patches. It has only two, curved, extra-branchial processes.

Ecology
Ancula evelinae probably feeds on Entoprocta which often grow on hydroids, bryozoa and other living substrata.

References

Goniodorididae
Gastropods described in 1961